Turkic may refer to:

 anything related to the country of Turkey
 Turkic languages, a language family of at least thirty-five documented languages
 Turkic alphabets (disambiguation)
 Turkish language, the most widely spoken Turkic language
 Turkic peoples, a collection of ethno-linguistic groups
 Turkic migration, the expansion of the Turkic tribes and Turkic languages, mainly between the 6th and 11th centuries
 Turkic mythology
 Turkic nationalism (disambiguation)
 Turkic tribal confederations

See also

 
 Turk (disambiguation)
 Turki (disambiguation)
 Turkish (disambiguation)
 Turkiye (disambiguation)
 Turkey (disambiguation)
 List of Turkic dynasties and countries

Language and nationality disambiguation pages